Siddha Natheswarar Temple is a Hindu temple located in the village of Thirunarayur in the Thanjavur district of Tamil Nadu, India. The presiding deity is Shiva.

Location 
The temple is located near Nachiyar Koil, a temple dedicated to Vishnu. Thirunarayur is located at a distance of 10 kilometres from Kumbakonam on the road to Tiruvarur.

Deity 
The principal deity is Siddha Nateswarar, a form of Shiva. There are shrines to Ganesha, Soundaranayaki, Dakshinamurthy, Lakshmi, Brahma, Bhairava and the Navagrahas.

Significance 
Hymns in praise of the temple were sung by Sambandar and Sundarar.

References 
 

Shiva temples in Thanjavur district
Padal Petra Stalam